Umarkot Shiv Mandir, also known as Amarkot Shiv Mandir, is a Hindu temple situated in Umerkot District, near Rana Jaageer Goth, in Sindh Province of Pakistan. This temple is perhaps the oldest in Sindh. The temple is one of the most sacred Hindu place of worship in the Sindh

History 

According to the legend, thousands of years ago a man used to nourish cows here, where there was wide patches of grown grass. But eventually he noticed that one of his cows would go somewhere else and give her milk to a Lingam nearby. The man kept an eye on his cow and investigated her peculiar behaviour. Subsequently, people visited the area and after checking they concluded that it was a Shiv Lingam. Thus, Shiv Mandir was built. The current structure of the temple was built by a Muslim man a century ago.

Deity
The temple has magnificent Shiv Lingam, which is indeed one of the best in the whole world. Legend says that the Lingam kept growing itself until locals marked the height to literally observe the growth.

Festival

Every year on Maha Shivaratri, there is a huge three-day festival.   On Maha Shivratri, many Pilgrims from lower and upper Sindh come and most of them stay for the three days of festivities. It is one of the biggest religious festivals in the country. It is attended by around 250,000 people. All the expenses were borne by the All Hindu Panchayat of Umarkot.

See also

 Hinduism in Pakistan
 Shiv temple, Hyderabad
 Shri Hinglaj Mata temple
 Kalat Kali Temple
 Katasraj temple 
 Prahladpuri Temple, Multan
 Sadh Belo
 Shri Varun Dev Mandir

References

Umerkot
Hindu temples in Sindh